Alexandre de Alexandris, B. (died October 10, 1738) served as the Apostolic Vicar of Cochinchina (1728–1738) and Coadjutor Apostolic Vicar of Cochinchina (1725–1728)).

Biography
Alexandre de Alexandris was ordained a priest in the Clerics Regular of St. Paul. On December 22, 1725, Pope Benedict XIII appointed him the Coadjutor Apostolic Vicar of Cochinchina and Titular Bishop of Nabala. In 1726, he was consecrated bishop by François Perez, Apostolic Vicar of Cochinchina. On September 20, 1728, he succeeded to the Apostolic Vicar of Cochinchina. He died on October 10, 1738.

References

1738 deaths
Italian Roman Catholic titular bishops
18th-century Roman Catholic bishops in Vietnam
Italian Roman Catholic missionaries
Roman Catholic missionaries in Vietnam
Bishops appointed by Pope Benedict XIII
Italian expatriates in Vietnam